"One Last Cry" is a song co-written and co-produced by Brandon Barnes, Melanie Barnes and Brian McKnight. The song was performed by American contemporary R&B singer Brian McKnight, issued as the fourth single from his eponymous debut album. It was McKnight's first solo hit on the Billboard Hot 100 chart, peaking at number 13 in 1993.

Since its release, "One Last Cry" has been covered by several artists, including: Backstreet Boys, Justin Timberlake, Marina Elali, Martin Nievera, Billy Crawford, Nina, Sabrina, Heather Headley and Peck Palitchoke.

Personnel  
 Clare Fischer – string arrangement 
 Brian McKnight – keyboard
 John Willis – acoustic guitar

Music video 

The official music video for the song was directed by Leta Warner.

Charts

Weekly charts

Year-end charts

References

External links 
 
 

1991 songs
1993 singles
1990s ballads
Mercury Records singles
Brian McKnight songs
Pop ballads
Contemporary R&B ballads
Songs about loneliness
Song recordings produced by Brian McKnight
Songs written by Brian McKnight